Burditt Brook is a river located in central Otsego County, New York. The creek converges with the Susquehanna River by Hyde Park, New York.

References

Rivers of New York (state)
Rivers of Otsego County, New York